A by-election for the seat of Gloucester in the New South Wales Legislative Assembly was held on 12 October 1985. The by-election was triggered by the resignation of  MP Leon Punch.

Dates

Result

 MP Leon Punch resigned.

See also
Electoral results for the district of Gloucester
List of New South Wales state by-elections

References

1985 elections in Australia
New South Wales state by-elections
1980s in New South Wales